Pastukh is a Ukrainian surname. Notable people with the surname include:

 Ivan Pastukh (born 1998), Ukrainian footballer
 Taras Pastukh (born 1978), Ukrainian politician

See also
 

Ukrainian-language surnames